PSNI may refer to:

Police Service of Northern Ireland
PSNI F.C., a football club associated with the Police Service
PSNI GAA, a Gaelic games club associated with the Police Service
Pharmaceutical Society of Northern Ireland